Greatest Hits & Unheard Bits is the second greatest hits album by Space, released on 22 September 2003. It includes all the band's singles, as well as tracks from their previous albums and songs remaining from their "unfinished" third album Love You More than Football.

Track listing
"Female Of The Species"
"Avenging Angels"
"Me And You Versus the World"
"Neighbourhood"
"The Ballad of Tom Jones"
"We've Gotta Get Outta This Place"
"Dark Clouds"
"Bad Days" (Remix)
"Money"
"Lovechild Of the Queen"
"1 O'Clock"
"Begin Again"
"Be There"
"Mister Psycho"
"Voodoo Roller"
"Good Times"
"I Love You More Than Football"

2003 greatest hits albums
Space (English band) albums